Ryat (often stylized as RYAT and pronounced "riot") is an experimental electronic music project created by female producer Christina Amalie Mattei, also known as Christina Teleaer, based in Los Angeles, California. She has released music on Obvious Bandits, Brainfeeder, Ninja Tune.

Career
RYAT began in 2006 in Philadelphia, where Mattei met DJ/producer King Britt, who encouraged her to produce her own music using Ableton Live. She studied music programming, producing and hosted improvisation sessions playing with the older jazz fusion artists, Calvin Westin and Elliot Levin . Taylor McFerrin inspired her to create a live producers set up with Ableton, inspiring her to loop her music productions live. She met jazz musician, Tim Conley at a jam session at his house and started a band called As Human. After their band As Human split, she asked Conley to join her on tour.

In 2009, Ryat released the debut album, Street Noise Orkestra. Her second album, Avant Gold, was released in 2011. Her live show got the attention of Flying Lotus, who later invited her to join his label, Brainfeeder. She relocated to Los Angeles and was inspired by the natural surroundings and mysticism. Her third album, Totem, was released on the label in 2012. In 2015, she released music written for a Mixed Media show with dancers, projection mapping and interactive sensory technology, Alt Mode, which debuted in Central Park in 2015.
In (2021) she started a new project, titled Christina Teleaer, which focused more on song writing and composing, compared to RYAT, which is very experimental in nature.

Style and influences
Mattei's project Ryat, is known for "maximalist production" in approach, often experimenting in electronics, vocal looping, and lush soundscapes. She has been compared with the artists like Björk. The music has been described as "beat couture".

Discography

LPs
 Street Noise Orkestra (2009)
 Avant Gold (2011)
 Totem (2012)
 Alt Mode (2015)

Compilation albums
 Avant Gold Remixed (2011)
 Retrogrades B-Sides 2012-2014 (2018)
 Bedroom Demos (2018)

Guest appearances
 King Britt - "The Intricate Beauty" from The Intricate Beauty (2010)
 Lushlife - "Progress (Sun Glitters Reprise)" from Plateau Vision (2012)
 Soil & "Pimp" Sessions - "Kioku No Tabi" from Circles (2013)
 Botany - "Simple Creatures" from Lava Diviner (2013)
 Mast - "Until You Are Sound" from Omni (2014)
 Taylor McFerrin - "Place in My Heart" from Early Riser (2014)
 Botany - "Monthiversary" from Dimming Awe, the Light Is Raw (2015)
 Nadastrom - "Phantom Eyes" from Nadastrom (2015)
 Mast - "The Breakup" from Love and War (2016)

References

External links
 

Year of birth missing (living people)
Living people
Singers from California
Musicians from Los Angeles
American electronic musicians
American experimental musicians
American women in electronic music
21st-century American singers
21st-century American women singers